A Sievert chamber is a type of ionization chamber used in radiation dose measurements. It was invented by Professor Rolf Maximilian Sievert in Sweden in the years 1920-40.

See also
 Geiger–Müller tube
 Ionization chamber
 Dosimetry

References

Particle detectors